Goran Vasic is a retired Yugoslavian association football player who played professionally in Yugoslavia and the United States.

When Vasic was eight, he entered the Red Star Belgrade youth system.  In 1990, he began his professional career with Jugopetrol Belgrade.  He played for FK Palilulac Beograd before moving to the United States in May 1997.  When he arrived, Vasic signed with the Houston Hotshots of the Continental Indoor Soccer League.  In 1998, he moved to the Cleveland Crunch of the National Professional Soccer League, winning the league championship with them that season.  In 2002, the Crunch traded Vasic to the Philadelphia KiXX.  Vasic again won the league title as the KiXX took the 2002 Major Indoor Soccer League championship over the Milwaukee Wave.  The KiXX released Vasic during the 2006 off season.  On February 13, 2007, Vasic signed with the Wave for the second half of the season.  In the fall of 2007, Vasic joined the New Jersey Ironmen, playing two seasons with them, the second in the Xtreme Soccer League.  In addition to his indoor career, Vasic also played the 1999 and 2000 outdoor seasons with the Pittsburgh Riverhounds of the USL A-League.

On November 28, 2008, Vasic became an assistant coach with the Ironmen.

References

Living people
1972 births
Continental Indoor Soccer League players
Cleveland Crunch (2001–2002 MISL) players
Cleveland Crunch (NPSL) players
FK Radnički Beograd players
Houston Hotshots players
Major Indoor Soccer League (2001–2008) players
Milwaukee Wave players
National Professional Soccer League (1984–2001) players
New Jersey Ironmen players
Philadelphia KiXX players
Pittsburgh Riverhounds SC players
A-League (1995–2004) players
Xtreme Soccer League players
Association football midfielders
Yugoslav footballers